Retry was a free-to-play retro-styled side-scrolling video game developed by Rovio LVL11 and published by Rovio Entertainment. Inspired by Flappy Bird, Retry had similar controls. The game was soft launched in Finland, Canada, and Poland in May 2014. The worldwide iOS and Android release was on October 22, 2014. As of 2017, Retry has been taken off the app stores.

Gameplay
The goal of the game was to send an airplane from one hangar to another hangar in different places. There were many obstacles between the two points, including air and moving landscapes.

The game had in-app purchases, and users could pay to make the game ad-free.

The goal of the game was to bring the airplane from one hangar into another hangar without crashing into obstacles (even the ground). In order to move the plane, the players simply had to tap the screen. The plane would then move forwards and upwards. Releasing the finger from the screen made the plane move down. (Similar gameplay has appeared before in old Finnish games, such as Triplane Turmoil (1996) by Dodekaedron Software and even more similarly in Super Sukkula (1994) by Lasse Makkonen.)

In every level, there was at least one "retry point", that when landed upon changes the plane's spawn point into that of the retry point for one coin. The game, unlike Flappy Bird, could also let players loop the plane, and even fly backwards. There were also new gameplay elements such as liquid physics, moving obstacles, stars, and currency (for unlocking levels early and acquiring retry points), which could be earned via achievements or playing levels and purchased for real money.

In certain levels, there were elements that could increase the difficulty. The wind could slow down the plane, water could drown the plane (but not crash), and moving terrain. There were also locked blocks in some levels that locks a certain level path, that could only be opened by unlocking the next level pack.

Like all Rovio games, Retry had a 3-star format. The first star was earned by finishing the level, the second star was earned by not crashing a certain number of times, and the third star by not flying more than a certain distance. Stars, not only shows the mastery of each level but are also used to unlock additional level packs.

Reception

Patrick O'Rourke of canada.com described the game as taking "one of the few things that was great about Flappy Bird", namely the satisfaction of repeatedly retrying the same simple task, and building a full game around the idea. He saw its visuals as paying homage to the Nintendo Entertainment System without "completely ripping them off" as Flappy Bird had done, and summarised the game as a "decent pick-up-and-play iOS title".

References

External links 
 

2014 video games
Android (operating system) games
IOS games
Video games developed in Finland
Free-to-play video games
Side-scrolling video games
Rovio Entertainment games
Single-player video games